The South American Road Mile Championships (Spanish: Campeonatos Sudamericanos de Milla en Ruta, Portuguese: Campeonato Sul-Americano de Milha de Rua) is an annual road running competition over the distance of one mile organized by CONSUDATLE for athletes representing the countries of its member associations.

Editions

Results 
The winners were published.

Men 

References

Continental athletics championships
Mile races
Mile Road Championships
Road running competitions